Trecastell is a village in the community of Aberffraw, Anglesey, Wales.

History
Llywelyn the Great, Prince of the Kingdom of Gwynedd, granted lands around Trecastell to Ednyfed Fychan. During the 14th century, Trecastell was the home of Tudur ap Goronwy, one of Ednyfed's descendants. He was a knight in the service of King Edward III of England, and a royal officer for Anglesey. He was also the namesake of the Royal house of his descendants; the House of Tudor.

See also
List of localities in Wales by population

Notes

References

Villages in Anglesey